CW 13 may refer to:
Television stations in the United States affiliated with the CW network

 WHAM-TV Rochester, New York (subchannel)
 WSCG (TV) Savannah, Georgia
 WTVG-TV Toledo, Ohio (subchannel)